Da Reality Show is the third studio album by the American hip hop recording artist Young Dro. It was released on September 18, 2015, by Grand Hustle Records and Entertainment One Music.

Release and promotion

On March 3, 2015, the song titled "We in da City", was released as the album's first single via digital distribution. The song, produced by Cheeze Beatz, was accompanied by a music video, released on April 26, 2015. "We in da City" was later remixed with a new verse from Dro's Grand Hustle label boss T.I., which was released on July 10, 2015. The single reached number two on the US Bubbling Under R&B/Hip-Hop Singles chart.

The album's second single, "Ugh", produced by Zaytoven, was released on August 21, 2015. On August 5, 2015, Dro released a mixtape to promote the album, titled Hellcat, produced entirely by Zaytoven. The music video for "Ugh" was premiered on September 9, 2015.

Critical reception
Alex Dionisio of Examiner.com, gave the album one out of five stars, writing, "In too many parts of Da Reality Show, Young Dro just hoots and hollers like a banshee, dissing his haters, threatening and perpetrating violence, arranging drug packages, taking the initiative to rep his own status and complaining about his sorry chances in life... the most troubling trait of Da Reality Show is its dumbed down gangsterism. Young Dro has some impressive vocal endurance, but what is the point if it is wasted on subject matter and tones that never enrich the listeners?"

Track listing

Personnel
Credits for Da Reality Show adapted from AllMusic

DB Bantino – featured artist
Ricco Barrino – featured artist
Danielle Brimm – management, production
Deunte Butler – composition
JD Butler – engineering, mixing
C-Gutta – mixing
Cheezebeatz – production
Xavier Dotson – composition
Clay Evans – associate production
Isabel Evans – A&R
Jason Geter – associate production
Paul Grosso – creative direction
D'Juan Hart – composition
Terrence Hawkins – executive production
IYA – featured artist
Andrew Kelley – art direction, design
Cam Kirk – photography
Colin Leonard – mastering
Lil' C – production
Hollywood Luck – featured artist
Thomas "Tillie" Mann – mixing
John McDonald – senior production
Candice Mims – featured artist
Victor Morante – direction
30 Roc – production
Angelina Sherie – strings
Elliot Stroud – composition, production
Julia Sutowski – production coordination
Trigga – featured artist
Wheezy – production
Young Dro – primary artist
Zaytoven – production

References

2015 albums
E1 Music albums
Grand Hustle Records albums
Young Dro albums
Albums produced by Zaytoven
Albums produced by Lil' C (record producer)
Albums produced by Mars (record producer)